Hirtocossus crucis is a moth of the family Cossidae. It is found in Madagascar.

This is a large heavy moth with a wingspan of 70 mm. The frontwings are dull white, with 2 fine angulated lines crossing,  the hindwings are uniformly dull grey.

References

Cossinae
Moths described in 1914
Moths of Madagascar
Moths of Africa